Agnes Keith may refer to:

 Agnes Keith, Countess of Moray (c. 1540–1588)
 Agnes Newton Keith (1901–1982), writer